The Hippoglossinae are a subfamily of fish in the family Pleuronectidae. The name is derived from the Ancient Greek words hippos, "horse", and glossa, "tongue".

Genera

 Clidoderma
 Hippoglossus
 Reinhardtius
 Verasper

Pleuronectidae
Fish subfamilies